Oakdale is a railroad station on the Montauk Branch of the Long Island Rail Road, on the corner of Oakdale-Bohemia Road and Montauk Boulevard in view of Montauk Highway across Norman DeMott Park, in Oakdale, New York.

History
Oakdale station was originally built as a depot by the South Side Railroad of Long Island in 1868, and was larger than most SSRRLI depots. It was razed in 1890 and a second station built in December of that year. Legend has it that the station was rebuilt in order to be suitable for guests arriving at the wedding of Consuelo Vanderbilt. As a result, the station is often referred to as "the wedding station." On December 10, 1994, the station lived up to its given nickname by hosting an actual wedding in front of the fireplace in the waiting room. Oakdale station also included carriage stables and a freight house that was active until the 1970s. Today this freight house is a storage facility for the Long Island Rail Road. The carriage stables were demolished at some point. High-level platforms were added in the late-1990s.

Station layout
The station has two high-level side platforms, each four cars long.

Notable Places Nearby
Connetquot River State Park
Dowling College
Former La Salle Military Academy

References

External links 

Train #272 @ Oakdale Station (TrainsAreFun.com)
Oakdale Freight House (1971 Photo; Unofficial LIRR Website)
YouTube Videos
Eastbound and Westbound Double-Decker Trains at Oakdale
 Oakdale Station History (TrainsAreFun.com)
 Unofficial LIRR Photography Site (lirrpics.com)
Oakdale Station
 Station from Oakdale-Bohemia Road from Google Maps Street View

Long Island Rail Road stations in Suffolk County, New York
Islip (town), New York
Railway stations in the United States opened in 1868